Monticello Brianza is a comune (municipality) in the Province of Lecco in the Italian region Lombardy, located in Brianza about  northeast of Milan and about  southwest of Lecco.

Notable people
 Giuseppe Sirtori, (1813–1874) soldier and diplomat
 Piero Maggioni, (1931-1995) presbyter

References

External links
 Official website

Cities and towns in Lombardy